Neville Tong (1934–15 June 2019)  was an English cyclist.

Cycling career
He represented England and won a gold medal in the 1 Km time trial at the 1958 British Empire and Commonwealth Games in Cardiff, Wales.

He won the Dundee grand Prix in 1956 and various trophies and medals for other events throughout the UK including both the British Cycling Federation and British grass track championships.

Personal life
Neville was born in Burton Constable, East Riding of Yorkshire, but brought up in Winterton, Lincolnshire. His wife, whilst swimming was rescued from the Caribbean currents as she got into difficulty; Welshman Nick Dibble, 63 years of age at the time, swam out and risked his own life to save hers. Having set up and run a successful construction and roofing business, Tong retired in 2013 and spent his retirement living in Scotter with his wife Joan.

Tong died on 15 June 2019 from a heart attack after stopping during a bike ride.

References

1934 births
2019 deaths
English male cyclists
People from Gainsborough, Lincolnshire
Commonwealth Games medallists in cycling
Commonwealth Games gold medallists for England
People from the East Riding of Yorkshire
People from Winterton, Lincolnshire
People from West Lindsey District
Cyclists at the 1958 British Empire and Commonwealth Games
Medallists at the 1958 British Empire and Commonwealth Games